Park Joon-hyung is a Korean name consisting of the family name Park and the given name Joon-hyung, and may also refer to:

 Joon Park (born 1969), South Korean-based American singer
 Park Joon-hyung (comedian) (born 1975), South Korean comedian
 Park Jun-Heong (born 1993), South Korean football player